Mount  Mystery is a prominent  mountain summit located in the Olympic Mountains in Jefferson County of Washington state. It is located within Olympic National Park on the Olympic Peninsula. Mount Mystery is the sixth-highest peak of the Olympic Mountains, after Mount Olympus, Mount Deception, Mount Constance, Mount Johnson, and Inner Constance. Its nearest higher neighbor is Mount Deception,  to the north-northwest. Little Mystery (6941 ft) is a subsidiary summit south of Mount Mystery.

Mount Mystery is located in the eastern portion of the Olympic Mountains just south of Mount Deception at the headwaters of Deception Creek. This location puts it in the rain shadow of the Olympic Range, resulting in far less precipitation than Mount Olympus and the western Olympics receive.

Mount Mystery sits on the boundary between the drainage basins of the Dungeness River, to the north, and the Dosewallips River to the east. Deception Creek, a tributary of the Dosewallips River, drains the east and west slopes of Mount Mystery, including a small melting glacier on the east side referred to colloquially as Mystery Glacier.

Mount Mystery was given its name circa 1915 by G.A. Whitehead of the U.S. Forest Service because he admired its regal appearance in foggy weather.

Climate

Based on the Köppen climate classification, Mount Mystery is located in the marine west coast climate zone of western North America. Most weather fronts originate in the Pacific Ocean, and travel northeast toward the Olympic Mountains. As fronts approach, they are forced upward by the peaks of the Olympic Range (orographic lift), causing them to drop their moisture in the form of rain or snowfall. As a result, the Olympics experience high precipitation, especially during the winter months in the form of snowfall. Because of maritime influence, snow tends to be wet and heavy, resulting in high avalanche danger. During winter months, weather is usually cloudy, but, due to high pressure systems over the Pacific Ocean that intensify during summer months, there is often little or no cloud cover during the summer. The months July through September offer the most favorable weather for viewing and climbing this mountain.

Geology

The Olympic Mountains are composed of obducted clastic wedge material and oceanic crust, primarily Eocene sandstone, turbidite, and basaltic oceanic crust. The mountains were sculpted during the Pleistocene era by erosion and glaciers advancing and retreating multiple times.

Recreation
While not a particularly technical climb, Mount Mystery is steep and exposed. If a climber falls and does not arrest immediately, loose rock and rotten snow may make it difficult to stop falling for some distance. The nearby Needles are typically regarded as providing better, and somewhat more difficult, mountaineering objectives in the Royal Basin area.

Gallery

References

External links

 Weather forecast: Mount Mystery
 
 2022 fatality: Climbing.com

Mystery
Mystery
Mystery
Mystery
North American 2000 m summits